"Love" is a song by the American singer Lana Del Rey. It was released on February 18, 2017, by Polydor Records and Interscope Records, as the lead single from her fifth studio album, Lust for Life (2017). The song was written and produced by Del Rey, Benny Blanco, Emile Haynie and Rick Nowels, with additional production by Kieron Menzies. Its release was first teased with promotional posters hung in Los Angeles on February 17, after which the release date was pushed up due to leaked versions of the song surfacing online the same day. The song incorporates alternative pop, bubblegum pop, dream pop, and rock with a 50s style.

Critical reception
The song received acclaim from critics. Eve Barlow of Pitchfork wrote that "'Love' is an ode to allowing yourself to feel" and that it "reassures the listener that the feeling can still lift, that love can still conquer". Barlow also gave the song the Best New Track designation. Daniel Kreps of Rolling Stone called the song "anthemic" and Frank Guan of Vulture called "Love" "marvellously good".

Pitchfork listed "Love" as the 28th-best song of 2017 in their annual ranking.

Commercial performance
"Love" debuted at No. 44 on the Billboard Hot 100, making it her highest-charting song on the chart since Ultraviolence's lead single, "West Coast". It also debuted at No. 2 on Hot Rock Songs, exceeding the No. 3 peak of "Young and Beautiful" in 2013. "Love" also launched as her first No. 1 on Rock Digital Song Sales (46,000 downloads sold, according to Nielsen Music) and at No. 5 on Rock Streaming Songs (6.6 million domestic streams). The song also peaked at No. 9 on the Digital Songs chart.

Music video
The music video was in production in June 2016, as reported by BreatheHeavy.com. Del Rey's hairstylist, Anna Cofone, also shared photos of her makeup kit on set on Instagram, which she later deleted.

On February 20, 2017, Del Rey announced the music video on an Instagram livestream. Shortly after the livestream it was made available on YouTube. The music video garnered over 19 million views within a week.

The music video begins in black and white, showing Del Rey singing on stage in front of a small audience, intercut with young adult couples getting ready for a day at the beach. As Del Rey sings the chorus, the video fades into color, and scenes of the couples floating through the solar system in their cars and alone. Towards the end of the video, Del Rey is also seen performing with her band on the surface of the moon, with the camera turning to the sky, where a symbolic black hole can be seen. It was directed by Rich Lee.

Daniel Kreps of Rolling Stone called the video "dreamy", while writing that the clip "alternates between black-and-white and washed-out color, Del Rey sings "Love" juxtaposed with footage of people "young and in love". Kelsey J. Waite of A.V Club wrote that "'Love' sends you tumbling through space", calling it a "stunning sci-fi video". Luke Morgan Britton of NME wrote that "The video sees Del Rey dramatically performing in Space", while Ben Kaye of Consequence of Sound called the clip "romantic".

Live performances
Del Rey first performed "Love" at the South by Southwest festival in Austin, Texas on March 17, 2017.

Use in media 
The song can be heard in the pilot episode of the television show Siesta Key. Los Angeles music producers DJDS and Empress Of also released a collaborative synth-pop cover of the song on December 1, 2017, via Loma Vista Recordings

Track listing

Credits and personnel
Credits adapted from Tidal.

Management
 Published by Heavy Crate Publishing (ASCAP) / Universal Music Publishing Group
 Published by Sony/ATV Music Publishing
 Published by Please Don't Forget to Pay Me Music.
 All rights administered by EMI April Music Inc. and Universal Music Publishing Group

Personnel
 Lana Del Rey – vocals, production
 Benny Blanco – production, keyboard, drums, mixing
 Mike Bozzi – mastering
 Emile Haynie – production, mixing, synthesizer
 Kieron Menzies – production, engineering, mixing
 Rick Nowels – production, keyboard, bass guitar, drums, mellotron, vibraphone
 Dean Reid – engineering, electric guitar

Charts

Weekly charts

Year-end charts

Certifications

Release history

References

External links
 Lana Del Rey – Love

2010s ballads
2017 singles
2017 songs
American electronic songs
American pop songs
Capitol Records singles
Downtempo songs
Interscope Records singles
Lana Del Rey songs
Pop ballads
Polydor Records singles
Songs written by Lana Del Rey
Songs written by Benny Blanco
Songs written by Emile Haynie
Songs written by Rick Nowels
Song recordings produced by Lana Del Rey
Song recordings produced by Benny Blanco
Song recordings produced by Emile Haynie
Song recordings produced by Rick Nowels
Trance songs
Vertigo Records singles
Music videos directed by Rich Lee